Jack MacGregor (15 September 1932 – 24 July 2017) was an Australian rules footballer who played for the Fitzroy Football Club in the Australian Football League (VFL) from 1952 until 1958, playing 87 games and kicking 23 goals.  He had previously played for Northcote Football Club in the Victorian Football Association.

References

External links

1932 births
2017 deaths
Australian rules footballers from Victoria (Australia)
Fitzroy Football Club players
Northcote Football Club players